Kentucky Route 434 (KY 434) is a  state highway in the U.S. state of Kentucky. The highway connects mostly rural areas of Hardin and Bullitt counties with Radcliff, Fort Knox, and Lebanon Junction.

Route description
KY 434 begins at an intersection with South Wilson Road in the south-central part of Radcliff, within the north-central part of Hardin County, where the roadway continues as Medical Center Drive. This intersection is just northeast of the Lincoln Trail Behavioral Health System hospital. It travels to the east-northeast and immediately intersects U.S. Route 31W (US 31W; Dixie Boulevard). It curves to the east-southeast and begins traveling along the southern edge of Fort Knox. The highway crosses over Mill Creek and twice slips into Fort Knox proper. Then, it intersects KY 251 (Shepherdsville Road). It curves to the east-northeast and crosses over Cedar Creek. The highway then enters Fort Knox. It curves to the northeast and crosses over Patty Branch before it leaves the Army base. It curves to the east-northeast and cuts across a corner of Fort Knox. It curves to the north-northeast, re-enters the base, and has an interchange with KY 313 (Joe Prather Highway). In the interchange, KY 434 crosses over Mud Creek. It travels through Booth and passes Paradise Lake. The highway curves to a nearly due north direction. It then crosses over Rolling Fork. This bridge marks the Bullitt County line and the city limits of Lebanon Junction. KY 434 curves to the southeast and to the east-southeast before meeting its eastern terminus, an intersection with KY 61 (Preston Highway).

Major intersections

See also

References

0434
Transportation in Hardin County, Kentucky
Transportation in Bullitt County, Kentucky
Fort Knox